Massad F. Ayoob (born July 20, 1948) is an American firearms and self-defense instructor. He has taught police techniques and civilian self-defense to both law enforcement officers and private citizens since 1974. He was the director of the Lethal Force Institute in Concord, New Hampshire, from 1981 to 2009, and now operates his own company. Ayoob has appeared as an expert witness in several trials. He served as a part-time police officer in New Hampshire since 1972 and retired in 2017 with the rank of Captain from the Grantham, New Hampshire, police department. On September 30th 2020, Ayoob was named president of the Second Amendment Foundation. His nickname is "the bad ass of self-defense."

Career 
Ayoob has authored several books and more than 1,000 articles on firearms, combat techniques, self-defense, and legal issues, and has served in an editorial capacity for Guns Magazine, American Handgunner, Gun Week, Guns & Ammo and Combat Handguns. Since 1995, he has written self-defense and firearms related articles for Backwoods Home Magazine. He also has a featured segment on the television show Personal Defense TV, which is broadcast on the Sportsman Channel in the US.

Ayoob has appeared in the courtroom as a testifying police officer, expert witness, and police prosecutor. Ayoob is believed to be the only non-attorney to serve as Vice Chairman of the Forensic Evidence Committee of the National Association of Criminal Defense Lawyers (NACDL), a position he formerly held.  His course for attorneys, titled "The Management of the Lethal Force/Deadly Weapons Case", was, according to Jeffrey Weiner: "the best course for everything you need to know but are never taught in law school."

Ayoob has also designed two tactical knives; in 1998 a sheath knife for Master of Defense (currently BLACKHAWK!), and in 2001 a folding knife for Spyderco.

Personal life
Ayoob is of Syrian descent. His grandparents immigrated to North America in the latter part of the 19th century.

Publications

Books

Videos

Podcasts
Ayoob hosts the ProArms Podcast.

See also
Jeff Cooper

References

External links

Massad Ayoob Group
Backwoods Home Magazine -- columns by Massad Ayoob
An Interview with a Lethal Man
 Personal Defense TV Season V

1948 births
American columnists
American magazine staff writers
American municipal police officers
American non-fiction writers
American people of Syrian descent
Firearm training
Gun writers
Living people
People from Grantham, New Hampshire